South of Scotland may refer to:

 The southern portion of Scotland
 Geography of Scotland
 South of Scotland (Scottish Parliament electoral region)
 South of Scotland District (rugby union), a rugby union team